Gonzalo Antonio Frechilla Armenteros (born 8 August 1990) is a Dominican Republic former footballer who played as a midfielder.

Career
Born in Santo Domingo, Frechilla played club football for Bauger before playing college soccer in the United States with the Maryland Terrapins and the FIU Panthers.

He represented the Dominican Republic at senior international level, scoring 1 goal in 2 games in 2010.

References

1990 births
Living people
Dominican Republic footballers
Dominican Republic international footballers
Maryland Terrapins men's soccer players
FIU Panthers men's soccer players
Bauger FC players
Association football midfielders